Infante Afonso of Portugal (8 February 1263, in Lisbon – 2 November 1312, in Lisbon; ;  or Alphonse) was a Portuguese infante (prince), son of King Afonso III of Portugal and his second wife Beatrice of Castile. He was titled Lord of Portalegre, Castelo de Vide, Arronches, Marvão and Lourinhã.

Afonso was born on 8 February 1263 and in 1287 married Violante Manuel, daughter of Castilian Infante Manuel of Castile.

Afonso died on 2 November 1312 in Lisbon.

Issue
By his wife Violante Manuel he had five children:
 Afonso of Portugal, Lord of Leiria;
 Maria of Portugal, Lady of Meneses and Orduña;
 Isabel of Portugal, Lady of Penela, married Juan de Castilla y Haro, with issue;
 Constança of Portugal, Lady of Portalegre, married Nuño González de Lara, without issue;
 Beatriz of Portugal, Lady of Lemos, married, as his first wife, Pedro Fernández de Castro, without issue.

Ancestry

1263 births
1312 deaths
House of Burgundy-Portugal
Portalegre, Portugal
Portuguese infantes
People from Lisbon
13th-century Portuguese people
14th-century Portuguese people
Sons of kings